Kyrkjevika (The Church Bay) is a bay at the southwestern coast of Svenskøya in Kong Karls Land, Svalbard. Kyrkjevika is partly sheltered by Antarcticøya and other islands.

References

Bays of Svalbard
Svenskøya